is  the Head coach of the Ryukyu Golden Kings in the Japanese B.League.

Head coaching record

|- 
| style="text-align:left;"|Oita Heat Devils
| style="text-align:left;"|2006
| 24||11||13|||| style="text-align:center;"|5th in bj|||-||-||-||
| style="text-align:center;"|-
|-
| style="text-align:left;"|Oita Heat Devils
| style="text-align:left;"|2006-07
| 40||22||18|||| style="text-align:center;"|4th in bj|||1||0||1||
| style="text-align:center;"|3rd place
|-
| style="text-align:left;"|Oita Heat Devils
| style="text-align:left;"|2007-08
| 44||19||25|||| style="text-align:center;"|4th in Western|||-||-||-||
| style="text-align:center;"|-
|-
|- style="background:#FDE910;"
| style="text-align:left;"|Ryukyu Golden Kings
| style="text-align:left;"|2008-09
| 52||41||11|||| style="text-align:center;"|1st in Western|||4||4||0||
| style="text-align:center;"|Champions
|-
| style="text-align:left;"|Ryukyu Golden Kings
| style="text-align:left;"|2009-10
| 52||33||19|||| style="text-align:center;"|2nd in Western|||4||3||1||
| style="text-align:center;"|3rd place
|-
| style="text-align:left;"|Ryukyu Golden Kings
| style="text-align:left;"|2010-11
| 50||34||16|||| style="text-align:center;"|1st in Western|||4||3||1||
| style="text-align:center;"|Western Champions
|-
|- style="background:#FDE910;"
| style="text-align:left;"|Ryukyu Golden Kings
| style="text-align:left;"|2011-12
| 52||39||13|||| style="text-align:center;"|1st in Western|||4||4||0||
| style="text-align:center;"|Champions
|-
| style="text-align:left;"|Iwate Big Bulls
| style="text-align:left;"|2012-13
| 52||34||18|||| style="text-align:center;"|4th in Eastern|||3||1||2||
| style="text-align:center;"|Lost in first round
|-
| style="text-align:left;"|Iwate Big Bulls
| style="text-align:left;"|2013-14
| 52||40||12|||| style="text-align:center;"|2d in Eastern|||2||0||2||
| style="text-align:center;"|Lost in second round
|-
| style="text-align:left;"|Iwate Big Bulls
| style="text-align:left;"|2014-15
| 52||41||11|||| style="text-align:center;"|2d in Eastern|||6||4||2||
| style="text-align:center;"|4th place
|-
| style="text-align:left;"|Osaka Evessa
| style="text-align:left;"|2015-16
| 52||35||17|||| style="text-align:center;"|6th in Western|||4||2||2||
| style="text-align:center;"|Lost in second round
|-
| style="text-align:left;"|Osaka Evessa
| style="text-align:left;"|2016-17
| 60||28||32|||| style="text-align:center;"|3rd in Western|||-||-||-||
| style="text-align:center;"|-
|-
| style="text-align:left;"|Osaka Evessa
| style="text-align:left;"|2017-18
| 60||24||36|||| style="text-align:center;"|4th in Western|||-||-||-||
| style="text-align:center;"|-
|-
| style="text-align:left;"|Sendai 89ers
| style="text-align:left;"|2018-19
| 60||40||20|||| style="text-align:center;"|2nd in B2 Eastern|||-||-||-||
| style="text-align:center;"|-
|-
| style="text-align:left;"|Sendai 89ers
| style="text-align:left;"|2019-20
| 47||35||12|||| style="text-align:center;"|1st in B2 Eastern|||-||-||-||
| style="text-align:center;"|-
|-

References

1977 births
Living people
Ehime Orange Vikings coaches
Iwate Big Bulls coaches
Japanese basketball coaches
Osaka Evessa coaches
Ryukyu Golden Kings coaches
Sendai 89ers coaches